Winfred Trexler Root (March 9, 1879 to December 8, 1947) was an American historian and educator. Root was born in Mount Joy, Pennsylvania and received his undergraduate education at Princeton University. He earned a Ph.D. in history from the University of Pennsylvania in 1908, thereafter joining the faculty of the University of Wisconsin. In 1925 he accepted a position as head of the history department at the University of Iowa, succeeding Arthur M. Schlesinger, and would remain there until his death. George L. Mosse, who was a history professor at Iowa during Root's tenure, described him as a "benevolent dictator". In 1930 Root was elected to the Council of the American Historical Association.

Root was married and had one daughter.

References

1879 births
1947 deaths
Princeton University alumni
University of Pennsylvania alumni
University of Iowa faculty
University of Wisconsin–Madison faculty
People from Mount Joy, Pennsylvania